The Rossell Island tree frog ("Litoria" louisiadensis) is a species of frog in the subfamily Pelodryadinae found along streams in lowland forests on Rossel Island and Tagula Island in Papua New Guinea.

References

Litoria
Amphibians of Papua New Guinea
Amphibians described in 1968
Taxonomy articles created by Polbot